Chorioamnionitis, also known as intra-amniotic infection (IAI), is inflammation of the fetal membranes (amnion and chorion), usually due to bacterial infection. In 2015, a National Institute of Child Health and Human Development Workshop expert panel recommended use of the term "triple I" to address the heterogeneity of this disorder. The term triple I refers to intrauterine infection or inflammation or both and is defined by strict diagnostic criteria, but this terminology has not been commonly adopted although the criteria are used.

Chorioamnionitis results from an infection caused by bacteria ascending from the vagina into the uterus and is associated with premature or prolonged labor. It triggers an inflammatory response to release various inflammatory signaling molecules, leading to increased prostaglandin and metalloproteinase release. These substances promote uterine contractions and cervical ripening, causations of premature birth. The risk of developing chorioamnionitis increases with number of vaginal examinations performed in the final month of pregnancy, including labor. Tobacco and alcohol use also puts mothers at risk for chorioamnionitis development.

Chorioamnionitis is caught early by looking at signs and symptoms such as fever, abdominal pain, or abnormal vaginal excretion. Administration of antibiotics if the amniotic sac bursts prematurely can prevent chorioamnionitis occurrence.

Signs and symptoms 
The signs and symptoms of clinical chorioamnionitis include fever, leukocytosis (>15,000 cells/mm³), maternal (>100 bpm) or fetal (>160 bpm) tachycardia, uterine tenderness and preterm rupture of membranes.

Causes 
Causes of chorioamnionitis stem from bacterial infection as well as obstetric and other related factors.

Microorganisms 
Bacterial, viral, and even fungal infections can cause chorioamnionitis. Most commonly from Ureaplasma, Fusobacterium, and Streptococcus bacteria species. Less commonly, Gardnerella, Mycoplasma, and Bacteroides bacteria species. Sexually transmitted infections, chlamydia and gonorrhea, can cause development of the condition as well. Studies are continuing to identify other microorganism classes and species as infection sources.

Obstetric and other 
Birthing-related events, lifestyle, and ethnic background have been linked to an increase in the risk of developing chorioamnionitis apart from bacterial causation. Premature deliveries, ruptures of the amniotic sac membranes, prolonged labor, and primigravida childbirth are associated with this condition. At term mothers who experience a combination of pre-labor membrane ruptures and multiple invasive vaginal examinations, prolonged labor, or have meconium appear in the amniotic fluid are at higher risk than at term mothers experiencing just one of those events. In other studies, smoking, alcohol use and drug use are noted as risk factors. Those of African American ethnicity are noted to be at higher risk.

Anatomy 

The amniotic sac consists of two parts: 
 The outer membrane is the chorion. It is closest to the mother and physically supports the much thinner amnion.
 The chorion is the last and outermost of the membranes that make up the amniotic sac.
 The inner membrane is the amnion. It is in direct contact with the amniotic fluid, which surrounds the fetus.
 The amniotic fluid exists within the amnion, and is where the fetus is able to grow and develop.
 The swelling of the amnion and chorion is characteristic of chorioamnionitis, occurring when bacteria makes its way into the amniotic fluid and creates an infection within the amniotic fluid.

Diagnosis

Pathologic
Chorioamnionitis is diagnosed from a histologic (tissue) examination of the fetal membranes. Confirmed histologic chorioamnionitis without any clinical symptoms is termed subclinical chorioamnionitis and is more common than symptomatic clinical chorioamnionitis.

Infiltration of the chorionic plate by neutrophils is diagnostic of (mild) chorioamnionitis. More severe chorioamnionitis involves subamniotic tissue and may have fetal membrane necrosis and/or abscess formation.

Severe chorioamnionitis may be accompanied by vasculitis of the umbilical blood vessels due to the fetus' inflammatory cells. If very severe, funisitis, inflammation of the umbilical cord connective tissue, occurs.

Suspected clinical diagnosis 
The presence of fever between 38.0°C and 39.0°C alone is insufficient to indicate chorioamnionitis and is termed isolated maternal fever. Isolated maternal fever may not have an infectious cause and does not required antibiotic treatment.

When intrapartum (during delivery) fever is higher than 39.0°C, suspected diagnosis of chorioamnionitis can be made. Alternatively, if intrapartum fever is between 38.0°C and 39.0°C, an additional risk factor must be present to make a presumptive diagnosis of chorioamnionitis. Additional risk factors include:

 Fetal tachycardia
 Maternal leukocytosis (>15,000 cells/mm³)
 Purulent cervical drainage

Confirmed diagnosis 
Diagnosis is typically not confirmed until after delivery. However, people with confirmed diagnosis and suspected diagnosis have the same post-delivery treatment regardless of diagnostic status. Diagnosis can be confirmed histologically or through amniotic fluid tests such as gram staining, glucose levels, or other culture results consistent with infection.

Prevention 
If the amniotic sac breaks early into pregnancy, the potential of introducing bacteria in the amniotic fluid can increase. Administering antibiotics maternally can potentially prevent chorioamnionitis and allow for a longer pregnancy. In addition, it has been shown that it is not necessary to deliver the fetus quickly after chorioamnionitis is diagnosed, so a C-section is not necessary unless maternal health concern is present. However, research has found that beginning labor early at approximately 34 weeks can lessen the likelihood of fetal death, and reduce the potential for excessive infection within the mother.

In addition, providers should interview people suspected to have chorioamnionitis about whether they are experiencing signs and symptoms at scheduled obstetrics visits during pregnancy, including whether the individual has experienced excretion vaginally, febrile, or abdominal pain.

Treatment
The American College of Obstetricians and Gynecologists' Committee Opinion proposes the use of antibiotic treatment in intrapartum mothers with suspected or confirmed chorioamnionitis and maternal fever without an identifiable cause.

Intrapartum antibiotic treatment consists of:
Standard
Ampicillin + gentamicin
Alternative 
Ampicillin/sulbactam
Ticarcillin/clavulanate
Cefoxitine
Cefotetan 
Piperacillin/tazobactam
Ertapenem
Cesarean delivery
Ampicillin and gentamicin plus either clindamycin or metronidazole
Penicillin-allergy
Vancomycin + gentamicin
Gentamicin + clindamycin

However, there is not enough evidence to support the most efficient antimicrobial regimen. Starting the treatment during the intrapartum period is more effective than starting it postpartum; it shortens the hospital stay for the mother and the neonate. There is currently not enough evidence to dictate how long antibiotic therapy should last. Completion of treatment/cure is only considered after delivery.

Supportive measures 
Acetaminophen is often used for treating fevers and may be beneficial for fetal tachycardia. There can be increased likelihood for neonatal encephalopathy when mothers have intrapartum fever.

Outcomes
Chorioamnionitis has possible associations with numerous neonatal conditions. Intrapartum (during labor) chorioamnionitis may be associated with neonatal pneumonia, meningitis, sepsis, and death. Long-term infant complications like bronchopulmonary dysplasia, cerebral palsy, and Wilson-Mikity syndrome have been associated to the bacterial infection. Furthermore, histological chorioamnionitis may increase the likelihood of newborn necrotizing enterocolitis, where one or more sections of the bowel die. This occurs when the fetal gut barrier becomes compromised and is more susceptible to conditions like infection and sepsis. In addition, chorioamnionitis can act as a risk factor for premature birth and periventricular leukomalacia.

Complications 

For mother and fetus, chorioamnionitis may lead to short-term and long-term issues when microbes move to different areas or trigger inflammatory responses due to infection.

Maternal complications 

 Higher risk for C-section
 Postpartum hemorrhage
 Endometritis
 Bacteremia (often due to Group B streptococcus and Escherichia coli)
 Pelvic abscess
Mothers with chorioamnionitis who undergo a C-section may be more likely to develop pelvic abscesses, septic pelvic thrombophlebitis, and infections at the surgical site.

Fetal complications 

 Fetal death
 Neonatal sepsis

Neonatal complications 

 Perinatal death
 Asphyxia
 Early onset neonatal sepsis
 Septic shock
 Neonatal pneumonia
Infant respiratory distress

In the long-term, infants may be more likely to experience cerebral palsy or neurodevelopmental disabilities. Disability development is related to the activation of the fetal inflammatory response syndrome (FIRS) when the fetus is exposed to infected amniotic fluid or other foreign entities. This systemic response results in neutrophil and cytokine release that can impair the fetal brain and other vital organs. Compared to infants with clinical chorioamnionitis, it appears cerebral palsy may occur at a higher rate for those with histologic chorioamnionitis. However, more research needs to be done to examine this association. There is also concern about the impact of FIRS on infant immunity as this is a critical time for growth and development. For instance, it may be linked to chronic inflammatory disorders, such as asthma.

Epidemiology 
Chorioamnionitis is approximated to occur in about 4% of births in the United States. However, many other factors can increase the risk of chorioamnionitis. For example, in births with premature rupture of membranes (PROM), between 40 and 70% involve chorioamnionitis. Furthermore, clinical chorioamnionitis is implicated in 12% of all cesarean deliveries. Some studies have shown that the risk of chorioamnionitis is higher in those of African American ethnicity, those with immunosuppression, and those who smoke, use alcohol, or abuse drugs.

See also 
 Chronic deciduitis
 Funisitis
 Placentitis
 Wharton's jelly

Notes

References

External links 

 Overview at Cleveland Clinic.
 Cerebral palsy inflammation link (29 November 2003) at BBC.

Inflammations
Pathology of pregnancy, childbirth and the puerperium